"The Onion Song" was a hit for soul singers Marvin Gaye and Tammi Terrell in 1969. It reached the top ten overseas, where it became Gaye & Terrell's biggest hit in the United Kingdom, entering the singles chart on 15 November 1969 and peaking at No.9 on 9 December.  
"The Onion Song" was a more modest hit in the U.S. where it peaked at No. 18 on the soul singles chart and No. 50 on the Billboard Hot 100

Background
The song's lyrics reflected social consciousness.  Tammi Terrell died, aged 24, just prior to the song's release as a single in the U.S.

Chart performance

Credits
All vocals by Marvin Gaye and Tammi Terrell/Valerie Simpson
All instrumentation by The Funk Brothers

References

1969 singles
1970 singles
Marvin Gaye songs
Tammi Terrell songs
Songs written by Valerie Simpson
Songs written by Nickolas Ashford
Male–female vocal duets
Motown singles
Song recordings produced by Ashford & Simpson
1969 songs